James Franklin Fuller (1835–1924) was an Irish actor, architect and novelist.

Life
Fuller was born at Nedanone, County Kerry, the only son of Thomas Harnett Fuller of Glashnacree, County Kerry, by his first wife, Frances Diana, a daughter of Francis Christopher Bland of Derryquin Castle. He was educated in Blackrock, County Cork, and Dublin.

In 1850 he went to London where he qualified as an architect, and later moved to Manchester.

In 1862 he became a district architect under the Board of Ecclesiastical Commissioners in Ireland. In 1869, after the Church of Ireland was disestablished, he set up his own practice in Dublin. Two years later he became architect to the Representative Church Body and shortly afterwards was appointed architect to St. Patrick's Cathedral, as well as to a number of other institutions.

He ran a busy, though, according to his memoirs, unconventional, practice, not keeping ledgers or books and disdaining keeping financial records. As well as his ecclesiastical projects and public building works, he designed a number of large houses around Kerry. He designed Kylemore Abbey, Connemara, in the 1860s and a few years later the neighbouring neo-Gothic church, a building of international significance.

During the 1890s, he took on George F. Beckett as a pupil and then junior assistant.

He wrote works of fiction, including Culmshire Folk (Cassell, 1873) and John Orlebar, Clerk (Cassell, 1878) and many articles of a historical and genealogical nature.

He was a great-grandfather of actress Peggy Cummins.

Works
Some of his more prominent projects include:

Arms

References

External links
Irish Architectural Archive - Dictionary of Irish Architects 1720-1940 - Fuller, James Franklin

1835 births
1924 deaths
Irish architects
People from Iveragh Peninsula